The 1973 Virginia Slims of Washington  was a women's tennis tournament played on indoor carpet courts at the Linden Hill Racquet Club in Bethesda, Maryland in the United States that was part of the 1973 Virginia Slims World Championship Series. It was the second edition of the tournament and was held from January 29 through February 4, 1973. First-seeded Margaret Court won the singles title and earned $10,000 first-prize money.

Finals

Singles
 Margaret Court defeated  Kerry Melville 6–1, 6–2

Doubles
 Rosie Casals /  Julie Heldman defeated  Kerry Harris /  Kerry Melville 6–3, 6–3

Prize money

References

Virginia Slims of Washington
Virginia Slims of Washington
1973 in sports in Washington, D.C.
Virgin